Katsumasa (written: 勝政, 勝正, 勝昌 or 克昌) is a masculine Japanese given name. Notable people with the name include:

, Japanese daimyō
, Japanese daimyō
, Japanese sumo wrestler
, Japanese golfer
, Japanese sport shooter
, Japanese politician

Japanese masculine given names